Craigie High School (CHS) is a co-educational government funded High school situated in the city of Dundee, Scotland. The school is located within Craigiebank and has been serving the areas of Craigiebank, Douglas and Pitkerro for over 50 years. It is planned to close in 2025 after a merger between the school and Braeview Academy was confirmed in January 2021.

History
In November 1963, the Dundee Sub-Works Committee asked the Town Clerk to negotiate for the purchase of 12 acres of ground at Craigie Home Farm south as a site for a new secondary school. The contract was won by Charles Gray (Builders) at a total cost of £935,000.

Craigie High School first opened its doors to pupils on 20 August 1970, although some building work continued until the official opening on 11 December 1970 by Sir Garnet Wilson, former Lord Provost of Dundee and whom the street entrance of the school, Garnet Terrace, was named for.

When opened, the school was considered a major step forward in improving education in Dundee due it being the first purpose built comprehensive school in the city. For this reason, the school was featured in the local newspaper The Courier.
As of 2019, Dundee City Council were considered replacing Craigie High and nearby Braeview Academy with a new school on the site of the former St. Saviour's High School, involving some of Craigie's pupils transferring to Grove Academy The merger was approved in 2021.

Houses

The school operates a house system, which is assigned at the start of S1 (first year) and split between classes (2 classes per house). Pupils remain in the specified house for the remainder of their education at CHS, although house classes become mixed in preparation for the National Qualifications exams at the beginning of 4th year, the pupils still have one class a week with their house group held by their guidance teacher.

The houses are named Isla, Lomond and Skye Nevis and are used with a points system during educational and physical competitions. Each house has a DHT assigned as House head and a teacher assigned as the Guidance teachers for the house.

Awards

In 2011, Craigie High School was awarded the UNICEF Right Respecting School Award Level 1. Tam Baillie, Scotland's RRSA commissioner, presented the award to staff and pupils at the school.

In 2000 the school won the Scottish Schools Ethos Award.

References

External links
 Craigie High School Website
 HMIE Report
 Craigie High School on Scottish Schools Online

Secondary schools in Dundee
Educational institutions established in 1970
1970 establishments in Scotland